Daolin is a rural town in Ningxiang City, Hunan Province, China. It has an area of 135 square kilometers. It is surrounded by Lianhua Town on the north, Hanpu Town and Xiangtang Township on the southeast, and Datunying and Huaminglou Town on the west. As of the 2000 census it had a population of 54,500.

Administrative division
The Town is divided into eight villages and one community, the following areas: 
 Daolin Community
 Jinhua
 Jinshui
 Shanshanling
 Xinxing
 Huaxinshi
 Hedongxin
 Longquanhu
 Shijin

History
During the Southern Song dynasty, Xie Ying retired into the country, he lived in here, and named it "Daolin", Xie Ying's tomb is located in here.

Geography
The Jin River, a tributary of the Xiang River, flows through the town.

Economy
The region abounds with refractory clay.

Culture
Huaguxi is the most influence local theater.

Transportation

Expressway
The Changsha-Shaoshan-Loudi Expressway, which runs east to Yuelu District, Changsha, and the west through Huaminglou Town, Donghutang Town, Jinshi Town, Huitang Town, Jinsou Township, Yueshan Town, Hutian Town to Louxing District, Loudi.

The S61 Yueyang-Linwu Expressway in Hunan leads to Yueyang and Linwu County through the town.

The G0421 Xuchang–Guangzhou Expressway runs north to south through the town.

The G60 Shanghai–Kunming Expressway runs east to southwest through the town.

Provincial Highway
The Provincial Highway S219 begins at Daolin Community and travels northeast to the town of Lianhua.

The Dao-Shan Highway runs north and reaches its junction with the Provincial Highway S219, and runs southeast and reaches its junction with the G0421 Xuchang–Guangzhou Expressway.

County Road
The County Road X087 travels northwest to Huaminglou. The County Road X089 travels southwest to Datunying. The County Road X088 travels south to Yunhuqiao.

Railway
The Shanghai–Kunming high-speed railway passes through the town east to west.

Attractions
The local specialties such as the Daolin fish, the Daolin rice, the Daolin jujube.

Celebrity
Xie Ying, was a Chinese writer and poet of the Song dynasty (960–1279).
Li Zehou, is a Chinese scholar of philosophy and intellectual history, currently residing in the United States.
Lu Shixian (1913–1977), was a Chinese historian.
Jiang Peichang, scientist.
Lu Gan, entrepreneur.
Lu Diping (1887–1935), was a Chinese general and politician.
Yang Dazhang, general.

References

External links

Divisions of Ningxiang
Ningxiang